Barrows is a surname. Notable people with this surname include:

Alice Barrows (1878–1954), American secretary
Annie Barrows (born 1962), American author
Arthur S. Barrows (1884–1963), American businessman, former president of Sears
Augustus Barrows (1838–1885), American lumberman and politician
Chester W. Barrows (1872–1931), Justice of the Rhode Island Supreme Court
Cliff Barrows (1923–2016), American minister
Cuke Barrows (1883–1955), Major League Baseball player
David Prescott Barrows (1873–1954), American anthropologist
Diana Barrows (born 1966), American actress
Eddy Barrows (active since 2003), Brazilian comic book artist
Edward M. Barrows (born 1946), American entomologist
Elijah Porter Barrows (1807–1888), American clergyman and writer
F. Jay Barrows (born 1956), American politician
Frank Barrows (1844-1922), Major League Baseball player
Geoffrey Barrows (born 1970), American inventor
George Barrows (1914–1994), American actor
Henry A. Barrows (1875–1945), American actor
Henry Dwight Barrows (1825–1914), American teacher and business man
Howard Barrows (1928–2011), American physician
Isabel Barrows (1845–1913), first female US State department employee
John Henry Barrows (1847–1902), American clergy man
Johnny Barrows, title character in 1971 American film Mean Johnny Barrows
Jim Barrows (born 1944), American skier
Leland Barrows (1906–1988), American ambassador
Lewis O. Barrows (1893–1967), American politician
Mercer Barrows (active since 1982), American producer and director
Pelham A. Barrows (1861-1939), American politician
R. Barrows (active since 1990s), American musician, designer, and writer
Samuel J. Barrows (1845–1909), American politician
Scott Barrows (born 1963), American football player
Sydney Biddle Barrows (born 1952), American businesswoman
Thomas Barrows III (active 2008–2010), American sailor
W.A. Barrows (active since 2004), Labor Member of the United States Railroad Retirement Board
Walter B. Barrows (1855–1923), American naturalist

See also
Barrow (surname)

English-language surnames